Ralph W. Brinton (1895–1975) was a British art director. He was nominated for an Academy Award in the category Best Art Direction for the film Tom Jones.

Selected filmography
 Blue Smoke (1935)
 Late Extra (1935)
 Sleeping Car to Trieste (1948)
 I'll Get You for This (1951)
 Tom Jones (1963)

References

External links

1895 births
1975 deaths
British art directors
British film designers